is a Japanese actor.

Career
Born in Tokyo, Omi joined the children's theater troupe Himawari Theatre Group when he was still in kindergarten. He made his film debut at age 13 in Kon Ichikawa's Hi no Tori (1978) and got his first starring role in a film with Shinji Somai's Tonda Couple (1980). He starred in Nobuhiko Obayashi's Tenkosei (1982), for which he won a Japan Academy Prize best newcomer award. He appeared in most of Obayashi's films until the mid-1990s. Since then he has moved on to adult roles, playing white collar businessmen and fathers.

Selected filmography

Film

 Hi no Tori (1978) – Nagi
 Tonda Couple (1980) – Nakayama, Wataru
 I Are You, You Am Me (1982) – Kazuo Saitoh
 The Girl Who Leapt Through Time (1983) – Goro Horikawa
 Haishi (1984) – Saburoh
 Itsuka darekaga korosareru (1984) – Shota Watakabe
 Lonely Heart (1985) – Hiroki Inoue
 Typhoon Club (1985) – Kobayashi
 Love Hotel (1985) – Assistant director 
 Shimaizaka (1985) – Ryou Sakura
 Rokumeikan (1986) – Kenjiro, Einosuke's son
 Noyuki yamayuki umibe yuki (1986) – Yuuta Hayami
 Makeup (1987)
 Hachiko Monogatari (1987) – Ogata
 Nihon junjo-den okashina futari (1988) – Hitman
 Hope and Pain (1988) – Arles, Sadaichi Takai
 Revolver (1988) – Arata Nagai
 Watashi no kokoro wa papa no mono (1988) – Yuuki Matsushita
 Bakayarô! 2: Shiawase ni naritai (1989) – Tamotsu Yoriai (Episode 3)
 Byôin e ikô (1990) – Sasazo
 Inamura Jên (1990) – Satoru
 Isan sôzoku (1990) – Kazuhito Fujishima
 Chizuko's Younger Sister (1991) – Tomoya Kaminaga
 Ryakudatsu ai (1991)
 Tsuribaka Nisshi 4 (1991) – Kazuhiko Usami
 Tōki Rakujitsu (1992)
 Okoge (1992)
 Seishun dendekedekedeke (1992) – Sugimoto Fujiwara
 Haruka, nosutarujii (1993) – Noburu Ohta
 Onna-zakari (1994) – Tamaru's secretary
 Nozokiya (1995) – Matsumiya
 Ashita (1995) – Megumi's Teacher
 Onihei hankachô (1995)
 Miyazawa Kenji sono ai (1995) – Fujiwara
 Happy People (1997)
 Ikinai (1998) – Kimura
 Kaza-hana (2000) – Nightclub manager
 Stacy: Attack of the Schoolgirl Zombies (2001) – Shibukawa
 The Twilight Samurai (2002) – Shichijuro Otsuka
 Kusa no ran (2004)
 Koi no mon (2004)
 Umezu Kazuo: Kyôfu gekijô- Negai (2005) – Yoshiro
 Arigatô (2006) – Kenta Arino
 I Just Didn't Do It (2006)
 Sekai wa tokidoki utsukushii (2006) – Customer
 Kôan keisatsu sôsakan (2007)
 The Triumphant of General Rouge (2009) – Keiji Mifune
 Wasao (2011)
 Itsukaichi Monogatari (2011)
 Kono sora no hana: Nagaoka hanabi monogatari (2012) – Tadahiko
 Megamisama (2017)
 The Negotiator: Behind The Reversion of Okinawa (2018) – Fumio Ishino
 37 Seconds (2019)
 Peer (2019) – Terunobu Kuramatsu
 Labyrinth of Cinema (2020) – Kondō Isami
 Rika: Love Obsessed Psycho (2021)
 Tombi: Father and Son (2022)
 Wedding High (2022)
 The Zen Diary (2022) – Takashi
 My Broken Mariko (2022) – Mariko's father
 Roleless (2022)
 The Legend and Butterfly (2023) – Hirate Masahide

Television
 Kusa Moeru (1979) – young Hōjō Yasutoki
 Hōjō Tokimune (2001) – Ashikaga Yoriuji
 Kekkon Dekinai Otoko (2006) – Nakagawa Yoshio
 Ryūsei no Kizuna (2008) – Hayashi George
 Teppan (2010)
 Ariadne no Dangan (2011) – Jōichirō Kitayama
 Taira no Kiyomori (2012) – Taira no Koretsuna
 Amachan (2013), Masamune Kurokawa
 Akira and Akira (2017) – Toshio Kitamura
 Naotora: The Lady Warlord (2017) – Sakakibara Yasumasa
 The Negotiator: Behind The Reversion of Okinawa (2017)
 Everyone's Demoted (2019) – Takashi Umehara
 Awaiting Kirin (2020) – Toki Yorinori
 Pareto's Miscalculation (2020)
 The Supporting Actors 3 (2021) – Himself
 Yū-san no Nyōbō (2021) – Masahiko Kobayashi
 Kamen Rider Black Sun (2022) – Isao Nimura
 The Makanai: Cooking for the Maiko House (2023)

References

External links
 Official profile (in Japanese)
 

Japanese male actors
1965 births
Living people
Male actors from Tokyo